Tunisia competed at the 2020 Summer Olympics in Tokyo. Originally scheduled to take place from 24 July to 9 August 2020, the Games were postponed to 23 July to 8 August 2021, due to the COVID-19 pandemic. Since the nation's official debut in 1960, Tunisian athletes have appeared in every edition of the Summer Olympic Games, except the 1980 Summer Olympics in Moscow because of the nation's partial support for the US-led boycott.

Medalists

Competitors
The following is the list of number of competitors in the Games.

Archery

Two Tunisian archers qualified for the men's and women's individual recurve, respectively, at the Games, by finishing in the top two, among those eligible for Olympic qualification, at the 2019 African Games in Rabat, Morocco.

Athletics

Tunisian athletes further achieved the entry standards, either by qualifying time or by world ranking, in the following track and field events (up to a maximum of 3 athletes in each event):

Track & road events

Boxing

Tunisia entered two female boxers into the Olympic tournament for the first time in history. Khouloud Hlimi (women's featherweight) and Mariem Homrani (women's lightweight) secured their spots by advancing to the final match of their respective weight divisions at the 2020 African Qualification Tournament in Diamniadio, Senegal.

Canoeing

Sprint
Tunisian canoeists qualified three boats in each of the following distances for the Games through the 2019 African Games in Rabat, Morocco.

Qualification Legend: FA = Qualify to final (medal); FB = Qualify to final B (non-medal)

Fencing

Tunisian fencers qualified a full squad each in the women's team sabre for the Games as the highest-ranked nation from Africa outside the world's top four in the FIE Olympic Team Rankings. Experienced Olympians Mohamed Samandi (men's foil), Farès Ferjani (men's sabre), Sarra Besbes (women's épée), and Rio 2016 bronze medalist Inès Boubakri scored additional places on the Tunisian team as the highest-ranked fencers vying for qualification from Africa in their respective individual events of the FIE Adjusted Official Rankings.

Men

Women

Judo

Tunisia qualified three female judoka for each of the following weight classes at the Games. Nihel Landolsi (women's middleweight, 70 kg), with Nihal Chikhrouhou competing in the women's heavyweight category (+78 kg) at her fourth consecutive Olympics, was selected among the top 18 judoka of their respective weight categories based on the IJF World Ranking List of June 28, 2021, while Ghofran Khelifi (women's lightweight, 57 kg) accepted a continental berth from Africa as the nation's top-ranked judoka outside of direct qualifying position.

Rowing

Tunisia qualified one boat in the women's lightweight double sculls for the Games by winning the gold medal and securing an outright berth at the 2019 FISA African Olympic Qualification Regatta in Tunis.

Qualification Legend: FA=Final A (medal); FB=Final B (non-medal); FC=Final C (non-medal); FD=Final D (non-medal); FE=Final E (non-medal); FF=Final F (non-medal); SA/B=Semifinals A/B; SC/D=Semifinals C/D; SE/F=Semifinals E/F; QF=Quarterfinals; R=Repechage

Sailing

Tunisian sailors qualified one boat in each of the following classes through the 2021 Lanzarote International Regatta and the 2021 Mussanah Open.

M = Medal race; EL = Eliminated – did not advance into the medal race

Shooting

Tunisian shooters achieved quota places for the following events by virtue of their best finishes at the 2018 ISSF World Championships, the 2019 ISSF World Cup series, and African Championships, as long as they obtained a minimum qualifying score (MQS) by May 31, 2020.

Swimming

Tunisian swimmers further achieved qualifying standards in the following events (up to a maximum of 2 swimmers in each event at the Olympic Qualifying Time (OQT), and potentially 1 at the Olympic Selection Time (OST)):

Table tennis
 
Tunisia entered two athletes into the table tennis competition at the Games. 2010 Youth Olympic bronze medalist Adem Hmam and Fadwa Garci scored their semifinal victories to occupy one of the four available spots each in the men's and women's singles, respectively, at the 2020 African Olympic Qualification Tournament in Tunis.

Taekwondo

Tunisia entered one athlete into the taekwondo competition at the Games. Mohamed Khalil Jendoubi secured a spot in the men's flyweight category (58 kg) with a top two finish at the 2020 African Qualification Tournament in Rabat, Morocco.

Tennis 

Tunisia entered one tennis player into the Olympic tournament. Playing in the court at her third straight Games, Ons Jabeur (world no. 26) qualified directly as one of the top 56 official entrants in the women's singles based on the WTA World Rankings of June 13, 2021.

Volleyball

Indoor
Summary

Men's tournament

Tunisia men's volleyball team qualified for the Olympics by winning the pool round with three match points and securing an outright berth at the African Olympic Qualification Tournament in Cairo, Egypt, marking the country's recurrence to the sport after an eight-year absence.

Team roster

Group play

Weightlifting

Tunisia entered five weightlifters (three men and two women) into the Olympic competition. Rio 2016 Olympian Karem Ben Hnia finished sixth of the eight highest-ranked weightlifters in the men's 73 kg category based on the IWF Absolute World Rankings, with rookies Ramzi Bahloul (men's 81 kg), Aymen Bacha (men's 109 kg), Chaima Rahmouni (women's 64 kg), and 2014 Youth Olympic bronze medalist Nouha Landoulsi (women's 55 kg) topping the field of weightlifters vying for qualification from Africa in their respective weight categories based on the IWF Absolute Continental Rankings.

Wrestling

Tunisia qualified ten wrestlers for each of the following classes into the Olympic competition; all of whom advanced to the top two finals to book Olympic spots in the men's freestyle (65 and 97 kg), men's Greco-Roman (67, 77, 97, and 130 kg) and women's freestyle wrestling (50, 57, 62, and 76 kg) at the 2021 African & Oceania Qualification Tournament in Hammamet.

Freestyle

Greco-Roman

References

Nations at the 2020 Summer Olympics
2020
2021 in Tunisian sport